The Presbyterian Church in Korea (YeJong) was a result of a split within the HapDongJeongTong due to theologically differences and leadership struggles. In 1985 it adopted the current name. It has 5000 members and 50 congregations. The Westminster Confession and Apostles Creed are officially accepted.

Presbyterian denominations in South Korea
Presbyterian denominations in Asia